Galunker is a children's novel by  Douglas Anthony Cooper., Illustrated by Dula Yavne

Conception

The book was funded by raising money by Kickstarter it raised $55,000 to get a publishing run. Because of the negative image of the pitbull, no mainstream book publisher would want to publish a children's book about pitbulls.
 The original target was $27,000.

Plot

The book is about Galunker, a misunderstood pitbull who seeks a home after a lifetime of dog fighting .

Reception

The book has been seen controversial as it has been accused on making pitbulls seem harmless. Barbara Kay being a notable example.

References

External links
Official site

2014 children's books
Novels about dogs
Fictional dogs
2014 Canadian novels
Children's novels about animals
Canadian children's books
Canadian children's novels